David P. Mindell is an American evolutionary biologist and author. He is currently a visiting scholar at the University of California, Berkeley, Museum of Vertebrate Zoology. Mindell's work is focused on the systematics, conservation and molecular evolution of birds, especially birds of prey. He is known for his 2006 book, The Evolving World in which he explained, for the general public, how evolution applies to everyday life.

From 1994 to 2008 Mindell was Professor of ecology and evolutionary biology and Curator of birds at the University of Michigan. He served as Dean of Science and Harry & Diana Hind Chair at the California Academy of Sciences between 2008 and 2011, and was Program Director in the Division of Environmental Biology at the US National Science Foundation during 2012 to 2016.

Biography 
Mindell was born in Buffalo, New York, where he attended Nichols School. He received a B.S. degree from Prescott College in 1975, and a Ph.D. degree from Brigham Young University in 1986. He was a post-doctoral fellow at Harvard University between 1987 and 1989, after which he joined the University of Cincinnati as an assistant professor.

In 1994, Mindell joined the University of Michigan where he taught evolutionary biology and served as professor and curator of birds. In 1998, he was appointed as the director of Genomic Diversity Laboratory at the Museum of Zoology, and in 2003, he was appointed the director of Museum of Zoology. In 2006, he was awarded the Radcliffe Fellowship at Harvard University, where he conducted research on variable rates of evolutionary change across genes and organisms.

He was elected to serve as the president of Society of Systematic Biology in 2011.

Research 
Mindell’s research focuses on evolutionary biology, and specifically the evolution and molecular systematics of birds. He has conducted comprehensive analyses of the systematics of diurnal birds of prey (hawks, eagles, falcons, vultures) in the orders Accipitriformes, Falconiformes and Cathartiformes. His work, funded by both U.S. National Science Foundation and The Peregrine Fund, includes assessment of the genetic distinctiveness and diversity of many poorly known groups of diurnal raptors, and resolution of taxonomic uncertainties.

Awards and honors 
 1986 – George S. Wise Post-doctoral Fellowship, Tel Aviv University, Israel
 1999 – Excellence in Research Award, University of Michigan
 2006 – Fellow of Radcliffe Institute for Advanced Study, Harvard University
 2007 – Independent Publisher Gold Medal Award, for "The Evolving World"'
 2008 – Fellow of the American Ornithologists’ Union
 2009 – Visiting Darwin Scholar, University of North Carolina at Wilmington
 2009 – Fellow of the California Academy of Sciences, San Francisco
 2011 – Distinguished Alumni Award, Brigham Young University

Publications

Selected articles 
 Ribosomal RNA in vertebrates: evolution and phylogenetic applications. Annual Review of Ecology and Systematics. (1990)
 Substitution bias, weighting of DNA sequence evolution, and the phylogenetic position of Fea's viper. Systematic Biology. (1993)
 Multiple independent origins of mitochondrial gene order in birds. Proceedings of the National Academy of Sciences. (1998)
 Interordinal relationships of birds and other reptiles based on whole mitochondrial genomes. Systematic Biology. (1999)
 Primers for a PCR-based approach to mitochondrial genome sequencing in birds and other vertebrates. Molecular phylogenetics and evolution. (1999)
 Homology evolving. Trends in Ecology and Evolution. (2001)
 Phylogenetic relationships among modern birds (Neornithes): towards an avian tree of life. Oxford University Press. (2004)
 Strong mitochondrial DNA support for a Cretaceous origin of modern avian lineages. BMC biology. (2008)
 Approaching a state shift in Earth’s biosphere. Nature. (2012)
 The tree of life: metaphor, model and heuristic device. Systematic Biology. (2013)
 Whole-genome analyses resolve early branches in the tree of life of modern birds. Science. (2014)
 Comparative genomics reveals insights into avian genome evolution and adaptation. Science. (2014)
 Rapid diversification of falcons due to expansion of open habitats in the Late Miocene. Molecular Phylogenetics and Evolution. (2015)

Books 
 Avian Molecular Evolution and Systematics (1997) 
 The Evolving World: Evolution in Everyday Life. (2007) 
 The Theory of Evolution: Principles, Concepts and Assumptions. (2020)

References 

Year of birth missing (living people)
Living people
21st-century American biologists
Evolutionary biologists
Prescott College alumni
Brigham Young University alumni
Radcliffe fellows